Ashfield Green is a hamlet near Stradbroke, Suffolk, England.

External links

Hamlets in Suffolk
Stradbroke